Matti Päts (born 10 April 1933 Tallinn) is an Estonian politician. He was a member of VII Riigikogu. Born to politician Viktor Päts, he is a grandson of Estonian statesman Konstantin Päts and writer Jaan Lattik

References

Living people
1933 births
Members of the Riigikogu, 1992–1995
Recipients of the Order of the White Star, 3rd Class
Tallinn University of Technology alumni
Politicians from Tallinn